Yumurtalık Island (also known as Atlas Island) is a small Mediterranean island in Yumurtalık ilçe (district) of Adana Province, Turkey.

There is a small castle in the north of the island. The castle was built in the 11th century,  during the late Byzantine or Cilician Armenia era. It faces the castle in the main land (Aegeae). It was an auxiliary unit of the port.   

Sometimes the island is also called Kızkalesi with the very same story of the Kızkalesi (castle) in Mersin Province.

References

Islands of Turkey
Islands of Adana Province
Yumurtalık
Mediterranean islands